Abdou Lahad Diakhaté (born 31 December 1998) is a Senegalese professional footballer who plays as a midfielder for Gorica.

Club career
Diakhaté began his career with the youth academy of ACF Fiorentina in 2013. On 25 January 2019, he signed a professional contract with Parma. Diakhaté made his professional debut for Parma in a 2–1 Serie A loss to Roma on 26 May 2019.

On 21 July 2019, Diakhaté joined Belgian club Lokeren on loan until 30 June 2020.

References

External links
 
 

1998 births
Living people
Footballers from Dakar
Senegalese footballers
Association football midfielders
Parma Calcio 1913 players
K.S.C. Lokeren Oost-Vlaanderen players
ND Gorica players
Serie A players
Belgian Pro League players
Slovenian PrvaLiga players
Senegalese expatriate footballers
Senegalese expatriate sportspeople in Italy
Senegalese expatriate sportspeople in Belgium
Senegalese expatriate sportspeople in Slovenia
Expatriate footballers in Italy
Expatriate footballers in Belgium
Expatriate footballers in Slovenia